The Secretary of the House of Representatives of Malaysia (Malay: Setiausaha Dewan Rakyat; ; Tamil: மலேசிய நாடாளுமன்றத்தின் பொது மன்றத்தின் செயலாளர்)  is the chief clerk of the House of Representatives of Malaysia.

Constitutional basis 
The office of Secretary of the House of Representatives of Malaysia is established under Article 65 of the Constitution of Malaysia, which establishes the SUDR together with that of Secretary of the Senate of Malaysia (SUDN) as may be appointed by the Yang di-Pertuan Agong (King of Malaysia).

Clause (5) of Article 65 provides that the SUDR cannot be an individual elected as either a Member of Parliament (MP) or a Member of Legislative Assembly (MLA). Clause (2) of Article 65 sets out for the office-bearer to hold office only until the age of 60. Article 125 stipulated that any removal of the SUDR outside of the incumbent's voluntary resignation can only be executed following the decision made by a tribunal appointed by the Yang di-Pertuan Agong having received the advice to do so from the Prime Minister of Malaysia.

Roles 
The Secretary of the House of Representatives is responsible for the proceedings of the House and assists the Speaker on matters regarding the House during these proceedings.

The duties also include sending out notices for commencement of meetings, collecting proposals, articles, Order Paper, votes and written enquiries from Members of the House and producing verbatim reports of proceedings.

List of Secretaries of the House of Representatives (1959–present)

Controversy 
In mid-May 2020, Riduan Rahmat's removal as SUDR led to an uproar especially amongst opposition lawmakers who challenged the constitutionality of his removal. He was re-assigned as the management division secretary of the Dewan Negara (Senate of Malaysia) which is one-rung lower in seniority than that of the SUDR. This was despite Rahmat being the senior-most parliamentary service servant having served since 1989. According to Articles 65 (3) and 125 (3) of the Constitution of Malaysia respectively, the SUDR can only be removed from office by a tribunal appointed by the Yang di-Pertuan Agong. Speculation was rife that Rahmat's removal was triggered by allegations that he was attempting to not reveal the motion of no confidence filed by former prime minister Mahathir Mohamad against the incumbent Muhyiddin Muhammad Yassin. Following his controversial dismissal, Rahmat leaves as having the shortest tenure as SUDR. Subsequently, the National Alliance (PN) governing coalition that wrested power from the Alliance of Hope (PH) in the 2020 Malaysian constitutional crisis removed the no-confidence vote from the agenda and altered the parliament sitting to consist of only the speech by the Yang di-Pertuan Agong.

See also 
 Speaker of the Dewan Rakyat

References 

Government of Malaysia